Dave Cameron is a baseball analyst for the Seattle Mariners. He was formerly the managing editor and a senior writer for FanGraphs, an analyst for the San Diego Padres, and owner-operator of USS Mariner.

Biography

Cameron grew up in Seattle, attending Christian Faith High School in Des Moines, WA from 1995 to 1999. In high school he developed a strong interest in baseball, discovering the alt.sports.baseball.sea-mariners newsgroup, reading Rob Neyer and playing the sport. Cameron, a varsity catcher, made the state's all-star team his senior year when he led the league in walks.  After high school he attended the University of North Carolina at Greensboro where he received his degree in economics.

In 1999 he began writing for Baseball Prospectus then, three years later, in 2002 he created U.S.S. Mariner with Derek Zumsteg and Jason Barker. The website was named after "the U.S.S. Mariner," a ship in the US Navy that would "fire its cannon after Mariner home runs and wins back in the 1980s". In 2008, he also acted for a while as ESPN commentator. In March 2009 Cameron began writing for the Wall Street Journal then in April of the following year, Cameron became the full-time managing editor and operator of FanGraphs.

On July 25, 2011, Cameron announced that he has been diagnosed with Acute Myeloid Leukemia. Treatment was successful and in December of that year he announced that he was joining the Baseball Writers' Association of America: "When I started writing about baseball [...] I never imagined it would turn into a career or that I'd ever be considered an Official Baseball Writer. The world is full of interesting twists and turns, though, and I'm happy to be able to walk through this newest open door."

Grandfather's murder

Cameron's maternal grandfather was murdered when his mother was 19, at the family home in Baltimore.  There is currently a documentary being made about the killing and how it shaped the lives of Cameron's 13 aunts and uncles.

An Open Letter

On June 27, 2007 Cameron wrote a post "An Open Letter To Rafael Chaves" asking Rafael Chaves, the pitching coach, to make Mariners' pitcher Felix Hernandez throw fewer fastballs: "Take over control of the pitch selection to start the game. Make Felix throw a change-up or a curve ball to the first batter. Throw a first pitch slider in the first inning.".  This letter eventually was passed along by a fan to Chaves, who had previously been attempting to make the same point to Hernandez and used the letter as reinforcement. Hernandez changed his pitching approach the next game saying: "On the internet, they say when I throw a lot of fastballs in the first inning, they score a lot of runs. I tried to mix all my pitches in the first inning."

San Diego Padres

On January 10, 2018 it was reported Cameron would join the San Diego Padres. His role would be senior analyst in the organization's research and development department.

Baseball writing
Cameron was the managing editor of FanGraphs, and, along with Derek Zumsteg, a founding member of a Seattle Mariners blog: U.S.S. Mariner He also previously wrote for ESPN, The Wall Street Journal, and Baseball Prospectus.

Among other topics he has contributed sabermetric research on HR/FB rate, correlations between velocity and strikeout rates, the general evaluation of pitcher talent, defense evaluation, and roster construction strategies.

External links 

 USS Mariner
 The Rise of FanGraphs - "Stats site gives fans, front offices view to baseball's evolution" by Barry Svrluga
 The Stats of Life - "Baseball analyst Dave Cameron has learned to beat the odds" by Doug Miller
 Interview Transcript - Dave Cameron interviewed by Bryan Smith (August 25, 2004)
 Interview Transcript - Dave Cameron interviewed by SCULU (March 27, 2009)
 Audio Interview - Dave Cameron interviewed by Carson Cistulli (July 5, 2010)
 Audio Interview - Dave Cameron interviewed by Jonah Keri (April 6, 2011)
 Audio Interview - Dave Cameron interviewed by Rob Shaw and Wayne Parillo of Bloomberg Sports (June 8, 2011)
 Audio Interview - Dave Cameron interviewed by Carson Cistulli (November 28, 2011)
 SABR101x: Interview with David Cameron, edX interview for Sabremetrics course on YouTube, 10:58

References

American male journalists
American sportswriters
Baseball statisticians
Living people
1980 births